Marcin Czajkowski (born 9 January 1982) is a Polish sailor. He competed at the 2004 Summer Olympics and the 2008 Summer Olympics.

References

External links
 

1982 births
Living people
Polish male sailors (sport)
Olympic sailors of Poland
Sailors at the 2004 Summer Olympics – 49er
Sailors at the 2008 Summer Olympics – 49er
Sportspeople from Gdynia